Ivo Buratović (3 March 1909 – 11 March 1971) was a Yugoslav athlete. He competed in the men's long jump at the 1936 Summer Olympics.

References

External links
 

1909 births
1971 deaths
Athletes (track and field) at the 1936 Summer Olympics
Yugoslav male long jumpers
Olympic athletes of Yugoslavia
Place of birth missing